"You're Welcome to Tonight" is a song written by Jim Hurt, Larry Henley and Grant Boatwright, and recorded by American country music artists Lynn Anderson and Gary Morris.  It was released in December 1983 as the third single from Anderson's album Back. The song reached number 9 on the Billboard Hot Country Singles & Tracks chart.

Chart performance

References

1983 singles
Lynn Anderson songs
Gary Morris songs
Songs written by Larry Henley
Songs written by Jim Hurt
Male–female vocal duets
1983 songs